Baes Fried Chicken, or Baes Chicken, is a fried chicken restaurant with three locations in Portland, Oregon.

Description 
Baes Fried Chicken is a fried chicken restaurant with three locations Portland; the business operates in Old Town Chinatown, in southeast Portland's Sellwood-Moreland neighborhood, and on Alberta Street in northeast Portland's Concordia neighborhood.

The menu includes fried and grilled chicken as tenders, bone-in, or in sandwiches, as well as Southern-inspired sides such as coleslaw, kale, macaroni and cheese, mashed potatoes, and waffle fries. According to Brooke Jackson-Glidden of Eater Portland, "The restaurant was designed to be very friendly to takeout and delivery, focusing on speed and its ability to hold up when it travels." Willamette Week has said the chicken is made "with ruthless efficiency and alarming consistency".

History 
Restaurateur Micah Camden (Blue Star Donuts, Boxer Ramen, SuperDeluxe) and National Football League player Ndamukong Suh opened the original restaurant in Old Town Chinatown in November 2020. The space had previously housed Ash Street Saloon. 1,000 free chicken sandwiches were distributed on opening day.

In mid 2020, the co-owners confirmed plans to open a second location on Bybee Boulevard in the Westmoreland district of Sellwood-Moreland, replacing a Boxer Ramen restaurant. The restaurant opened in July.

For the Super Bowl in 2021, Baes donated all proceeds from both locations to the Suh Family Foundation. The restaurant was a vendor at the Moda Center, as of 2021.

A third location opened on Alberta Street in 2023.

Reception 
The Oregonian Michael Russell included Baes in a 2020 list of the city's 40 best inexpensive restaurants. He has described the restaurant as "surprisingly tasty". Nick Woo included Baes in Eater Portland's 2021 list of "14 Outstanding Fried Chicken Sandwiches in Portland" and said the restaurant "does not disappoint". Katherine Chew Hamilton included Baes in Portland Monthly 2021 overview of the city's best fried chicken.

See also

 List of chicken restaurants
 List of Southern restaurants

References

External links 

 

2020 establishments in Oregon
Concordia, Portland, Oregon
Old Town Chinatown
Poultry restaurants
Restaurants established in 2020
Restaurants in Portland, Oregon
Sellwood-Moreland, Portland, Oregon
Southern restaurants